The Golden 8 is an album by American jazz drummer Kenny Clarke and Belgian jazz composer and pianist Francy Boland recorded live in Gigi Campi's 'gelateria' in Cologne in 1961 and released on the Blue Note label. The album established the relationship which led to the formation of the Kenny Clarke/Francy Boland Big Band.

Reception
The AllMusic review awarded the album 3 stars.

Track listing
All compositions by Francy Boland, except as indicated
 "La Campimania"
 "Gloria" (aka "Gloria's Theme from BUtterfield 8") (Bronislau Kaper, Mack David)
 "High Notes"
 "Softly, as in a Morning Sunrise" (Oscar Hammerstein II, Sigmund Romberg)
 "The Golden Eight"
 "Strange Meeting"
 "You'd Be So Nice to Come Home To" (Cole Porter)
 "Dorian 0437"
 "Poor Butterfly" (John Golden, Raymond Hubbell)
 "Basse Cuite"

Personnel
Kenny Clarke - drums
Francy Boland - piano
Dusko Gojkovic - trumpet
Raymond Droz - alto horn
Derek Humble - alto saxophone
Karl Drevo - tenor saxophone
Chris Kellens - euphonium
Jimmy Woode - bass
Wolfgang Hirschmann - engineer
Rudy Van Gelder - mastering

References

Blue Note Records albums
Kenny Clarke albums
1961 albums
Albums produced by Alfred Lion